Keratin associated protein 5-6 is a protein that in humans is encoded by the KRTAP5-6 gene.

References